Dr. Helmut Sell (1898–1956) and his wife Annemarie (1896–1972) were German Holocaust rescuers living in Berlin during the Third Reich. In 1981, they were posthumously honored as "Righteous among the Nations"  by Yad Vashem at a ceremony in Jerusalem. In October 2002, the medal was finally presented to the children of the Sells at a ceremony in Schenectady, New York.

Dr. Sell owned a small factory for fine mechanical parts at the Englische Strasse in Berlin-Dahlem. In March 1943, he hired as a delivery boy a Jewish youth who had been living illegally on the streets of Berlin since May 1942. Dr. Sell did not realize at the time that the boy, who showed up dressed in a Hitler Youth uniform, was a disguised Jew. When, three weeks later, the boy, Ezra Ben Gershom, confided his true identity, Sell responded by identifying himself as an old-time Social Democrat and a sworn enemy of the Nazi regime.

Sell arranged forged travel documents for the boy, which purported to prove that he was going to Vienna at the behest of the German armaments industry. On the last nights before the journey, he sheltered Gershom in his own home in Potsdam, and provided him with food and counsel. Dr. Sell's wife Annemarie was also party to the secret.

On May 28, 1981, Yad Vashem recognized Dr. Helmuth and Annemarie Sell as Righteous Among the Nations.

References

German Righteous Among the Nations